Entrance to a Forest is a 1660s landscape painting by the Dutch artist Jacob van Ruisdael. It today belongs to the Musée des Beaux-Arts of Mulhouse, France. Its inventory number is D.58.1.82.

The painting is catalogued as number 384 in the complete catalogue established by Seymour Slive in 2001. Slive describes it as "now obscured by dark, yellowed varnish and grime"; it has been cleaned up since.

References 

1660s paintings
Paintings in Alsace
Paintings by Jacob van Ruisdael
Oil on canvas paintings